

Classification 

Barren site
 Sites no longer in existence
 Sites that have been destroyed
 Submerged
 Reverted to pasture
 May have a few difficult to find foundations/footings at most

Neglected site
 Only rubble left
 All buildings uninhabited
 Roofless building ruins
 Some buildings or houses still standing

Abandoned site
 Buildings or houses still standing
 Buildings and houses all abandoned
 No population, except caretaker
 Site no longer in existence except for one or two buildings (for example old church, grocery store)

Semi-abandoned site
 Building or houses still standing
 Buildings and houses largely abandoned
 Fewer than 50 residents
 Many abandoned buildings
 Small population

Historic community
 Building or houses still standing
 Still a busy community
 Smaller than its boom years
 Population has decreased dramatically, to one fifth or less
 May now be census designated place
 May have been Absorbed by extant entity

List

Images

References

Additional sourcing
Texas. – GhostTowns.com
Texas Ghost Towns
Texas Escapes online magazine
Ghost Towns of Texas. Norman, OK: University of Oklahoma Press, 1986. Google Books. Retrieved August 19, 2013.

External links

 
Texas
Ghost towns
Ghost towns in Texas